Thomas Guy House is a historic home located near Mebane, Alamance County, North Carolina. It was built about 1890, and is a one-story saddlebag plan log house. It consists of two individual one-room log pens that share a common central chimney.

It was added to the National Register of Historic Places in 1993.

References

Log houses in the United States
Houses on the National Register of Historic Places in North Carolina
Houses completed in 1890
Houses in Alamance County, North Carolina
National Register of Historic Places in Alamance County, North Carolina
Log buildings and structures on the National Register of Historic Places in North Carolina